Bogado is a surname. Notable people with the surname include:

Ariel Bogado, Paraguayan footballer
Cristian Bogado, Paraguayan footballer
Diego Bogado, Argentine footballer
Floro Bogado, Argentine politician, lawyer and diplomat
Juan Mathias Bogado, Argentine footballer
Mariangee Bogado, Venezuelan softball player
Mauro Bogado, Argentine footballer
Rolando Bogado, Paraguayan footballer

See also
4269 Bogado, main-belt asteroid

Surnames